Jason Golden (born 6 November 1985), also known by the nicknames of "Fleecey", "Golds", "The Golden Child" and "Tackle machine", is an English former professional rugby league footballer.

Background
Golden was born in Rothwell, Leeds, West Yorkshire.

He was a product of the Leeds Rhinos academy, previously a junior for Oulton Raiders and Hunslet Parkside.

Career
Whilst part of the Leeds academy he has helped them on their way to winning the 2003 Grand Final, scoring a hat-trick. He was a prominent fixture in the senior academy side before been moved out on loan to York City Knights, where he made 22 appearances and scored five tries, and was selected in the 2006 National League One All Star team and named players' player 2006.

He made his Super League début in 2007 for Wakefield Trinity Wildcats following a pre-season move to the club, he spent 2 years with the Yorkshire side. Golden became a regular in the squad appearing 31 times. Golden joined London-based rugby league club Harlequins at the beginning of the 2009 season as part of coach Brian McDermott refresh of the team. He became an integral part of the London outfit until injury curtailed. Jason Golden returned to York, following his release from London, and was made club captain. Unfortunately, Golden's career was cut short due to a recurring pelvic injury.

Representative
Selected for the under-18 Great Britain Academy team which beat Australia for the first time. Also played for England at under-18 level. He was also a constant fixture in the junior representative teams.

He has been named in the Ireland training squad for the 2008 Rugby League World Cup.

References

External links
Harlequins profile
(archived by web.archive.org) Wakefield Trinity Wildcats profile

1985 births
Living people
English people of Irish descent
English rugby league players
Ireland national rugby league team players
Leeds Rhinos players
London Broncos players
People from Rothwell, West Yorkshire
Rugby league players from Yorkshire
Rugby league second-rows
Wakefield Trinity players
York City Knights captains
York City Knights players